Cumlosen is a municipality in the Prignitz district, in Brandenburg, Germany.

History
Between 1945 and 1990 Cumlosen served as East German inner German border crossing for inland navigation on the Elbe. The crossing was open for freight vessels navigating between Czechoslovakia, the Soviet Zone of occupation in Germany (till 1949, thereafter the East German Democratic Republic, or West Berlin and the British zone of occupation (till 1949) and thereafter the West German Federal Republic of Germany. The traffic was subject to the Interzonal traffic regulations and that between West Germany and West Berlin was subject to the special regulations of the Transit Agreement (1972).

Demography

References 

Localities in Prignitz